World order commonly refers to International order

World Order may also refer to:
World Order (band), Japanese band formed in 2009
World Order (book), 2014 book by Henry Kissinger

See also

New World Order (disambiguation)